The Melbourne Mint, in Melbourne, Australia, was a branch of the British Royal Mint. It minted gold sovereigns from 1872 until 1931, and half-sovereigns (intermittently) from 1873 until 1915. In 1916 it commenced minting Commonwealth silver threepences, sixpences, shillings and florins. From 1923 it minted all pre-decimal denominations. It minted rarities such as the 1921/22 overdate threepence, 1923 half-penny and 1930 penny, as well as Australia's four commemorative florins in 1927 (Canberra), 1934/35 (Melbourne Centenary), 1951 (Federation Jubilee) and 1954 (Royal Visit). It assisted the Royal Australian Mint in Canberra in producing one cent coins from 1966 to 1968 and two cent coins in 1966. From 1969 all coin production moved to the Royal Australian Mint in Canberra, and the building housing the coin minting equipment was demolished shortly afterwards. The remaining administrative building is now the home of the Royal Historical Society of Victoria, and has been leased to the private sector since 2001.

The former Royal Mint is located on the corner of William and La Trobe Streets (280-318 William Street and 387-429 La Trobe Street) and is of architectural significance as one of the most impressive 19th century government buildings in Victoria, and one of few Australian buildings in the true Renaissance revival style, and a virtual copy of the Palazzo Vidoni-Caffarelli, attributed to Raphael, in Rome (1515).

The mint was built between 1869 and 1872 to the designs of architect J.J Clark whose other notable works included the Old Treasury Building, Melbourne. It was opened 12 June 1872

The colourful coat of arms placed on the front gates in mid-twentieth century were by the Melbourne woodcarver Walter Langcake. The original design, based on Queen Victoria's coat of arms, is adapted especially for a British Royal Mint branch office in colonial Victoria. The supporting animals are not crowned and a maned horse replaces the usual unicorn.

Current tenants

Melbourne Mint (from October 2012)

A private company, Melbourne Mint Pty Ltd, is currently situated on the ground level and level one of the Melbourne Mint building. Melbourne Mint Pty Ltd belongs to a group of Australian precious metals companies which include Australian Bullion Company (ABC), Gold Merchants International (GMI) and Melbourne Mint Coins. It has no historical relationship to the original Royal Mint.

See also 

 List of mints

External links 
Photo: Melbourne Mint, from the State Library of Victoria
Brief history and photographs of the Melbourne Mint, from the Australian Architecture Discussion Forum.
Melbourne Mint - Online Coin Club, list of all coins struck by the Melbourne Mint.

Mints of Australia
Buildings and structures in Melbourne City Centre
Heritage-listed buildings in Melbourne
Renaissance Revival architecture in Australia
1872 establishments in Australia
Mints (currency)
1968 disestablishments in Australia